Jack Marc Doyle (born 2 February 1997) is an English professional footballer who plays as a defender for Southport

Career

Blackburn Rovers
In January 2017 Doyle signed his 1st professional contract at Blackburn Rovers penning a 2-year deal.

In August 2017 Doyle made his 1st team debut coming on as a substitute for Blackburn Rovers in the 3–1 2017–18 EFL Cup victory against Coventry City.

In September 2018 Doyle joined Maidstone United on loan. In November 2018 his loan was cut short due to injury.

On 15 May 2019 it was announced that Doyle will leave at the end of his contract.

Southport
On 1 August Doyle signed for Southport F.C.

Career statistics

References

External links
 

1997 births
Living people
Footballers from Liverpool
English footballers
Association football defenders
Blackburn Rovers F.C. players
Derry City F.C. players
Maidstone United F.C. players
Southport F.C. players
English Football League players
League of Ireland players
National League (English football) players